Blue Lights On The Runway is the fourth studio album by Irish band Bell X1. It was released in Ireland on 20 February 2009, and on March 3, 2009, in North America. It is a Choice Music Prize nominated album for Best Irish Album in 2009.

The first single from the album was "The Great Defector" (30 January 2009 in Ireland and 3 February 2009, in the UK and the US).

It has been certified Platinum in Ireland with record sales exceeding 15,000.

Critical reception
The album has been met with much acclaim, and has a Metacritic score of 73/100.
Allmusic gave the album 4/5, whilst Planet Sound gave it 8/10.

Track listing
"The Ribs of a Broken Umbrella" – 5:27
"How Your Heart Is Wired" – 6:14
"The Great Defector" – 4:40
"Blow Ins" – 4:36
"Amelia" – 6:58
"A Better Band" – 6:35
"Breastfed" – 4:11
"Light Catches Your Face" – 5:44
"One Stringed Harp" – 5:12
"The Curtains Are Twitchin'" – 5:08

Charts

2009 albums
Albums produced by Roger Bechirian
Bell X1 (band) albums